Thomas Jordan is a Barbadian professional football player and manager.

Career
He played for the national team.

Since 2008 until 2010 he coached the Barbados national football team.

References

Year of birth missing (living people)
Living people
Barbadian footballers
Barbados international footballers
Barbadian football managers
Barbados national football team managers
Place of birth missing (living people)

Association footballers not categorized by position